Lane Cove Road is a major suburban arterial road in Sydney, Australia.  It forms part of A3  and is located in the Ryde local government area.

The southern end of Lane Cove Road connects with Devlin Street at Blaxland Road at Top Ryde,  about one kilometre north of Victoria Road.   Lane Cove Road extends generally NNE, crossing Epping Road at a grade separated intersection at North Ryde,  and partly connecting with the M2 Hills Motorway.

Lane Cove Road ends north of De Burghs Bridge and where the A3 crosses the Lane Cove River, entering into the Ku-ring-gai local government area. At the junction with Lady Game Drive it changes name and continues as Ryde Road, all the way to the junction with the Pacific Highway at Gordon.

Lane Cove Road is the main access road from the central and southern suburbs of Sydney to the North Ryde/Macquarie Park commercial and industrial area. It's typically 3 lanes wide in each directions and carries a large volume of traffic, becoming very congested in morning and afternoon/evening peak hour traffic.

See also

References

Streets in Sydney